All Fired Up is the nineteenth and final studio album by American band Poco, released in 2013.

Reception

In his Allmusic review, music critic Steve Leggett wrote, "While this set, the group's first new album since 2003's Running Horse, has some bright, Poco-like moments with songs like "All Fired Up," "When She's Mine," and "Love Has No Reason," it's really a case of diminishing returns at this point... while it will please Poconuts, feels a bit generic and tired and in need of another voice or two."

Track listing

Personnel 

Poco
 Rusty Young – vocals, acoustic guitars, electric guitars, pedal steel guitar, lap steel guitar, dobro, banjo, mandolin, percussion
 Jack Sundrud – vocals, acoustic guitars, electric guitars, bass, harmonica
 Michael Webb – vocals, acoustic piano, Hammond B3 organ, clavinet, accordion, acoustic guitars, electric guitars, mandolin, bass
 George Lawrence – drums, congas, percussion

Guest musicians
 George Grantham – percussion on "All Fired Up"
 Bobby Keys – saxophone on "That's What Rock and Roll Will Do"

References

2013 albums
Poco albums